Acanthomysis is a genus of mysids, containing 28 species.

Acanthomysis anomala Pillai, 1961
Acanthomysis bispinosa Bacescu, 1979
Acanthomysis borealis Banner, 1954
Acanthomysis bowmani Modlin & Orsi, 1997
Acanthomysis brucei Fukuoka & Murano, 2002
Acanthomysis brunnea Murano & Chess, 1987
Acanthomysis californica Murano & Chess, 1987
Acanthomysis columbiae (W. Tattersall, 1933)
Acanthomysis dimorpha Ii, 1936
Acanthomysis fluviatilis (Babueva, 1988)
Acanthomysis hodgarti (W. Tattersall, 1922)
Acanthomysis indica (W. Tattersall, 1922)
Acanthomysis japonica (Marukawa, 1928)
Acanthomysis laticauda Liu & Wang, 1983
Acanthomysis longicornis (Milne-Edwards, 1837)
Acanthomysis longispina Fukuoka & Murano, 2002
Acanthomysis macrops Pillai, 1973
Acanthomysis microps Biju & Panampunnayil, 2009
Acanthomysis minuta Liu & Wang, 1983
Acanthomysis ornata O. Tattersall, 1965
Acanthomysis pelagica (Pillai, 1957)
Acanthomysis platycauda (Pillai, 1961)
Acanthomysis quadrispinosa Nouvel, 1965
Acanthomysis sinensis Ii, 1964
Acanthomysis stelleri (Derzhavin, 1913)
Acanthomysis strauchi (Czerniavsky, 1882)
Acanthomysis thailandica Murano, 1986
Acanthomysis trophopristes O. Tattersall, 1957

References

Mysida